Kaneis de leei s' agapo is a Greek popular television series written by Markella Grigoriou and Antigoni Pappa and directed by Stefanos Kontomaris, which aired on Mega Channel in 2004 and ran for 32 episodes.

The series focused on the love story between Korina and Haris, two entirely different people who are in denial of their sentiments but  after getting through various emotional situations, they eventually prove that opposites attract.

Cast and Characters

Main Characters

Guest Stars

References

External links
Kaneis de leei s' agapo in imdb - Internet Movie Database
MEGA TV

Mega Channel original programming
2004 Greek television series debuts
2004 Greek television series endings
2000s Greek television series
Greek-language television shows
Greek comedy television series